This is a list of mayors of Harvard, Illinois:

References
The Harvard Area
1829-1976
First Edition Published by the Harvard Bicentennial Commission December 31, 1976

External links

City of Harvard

Harvard, Illinois
Mayors

1891 establishments in Illinois